Moycullen GAA is a group title for several Gaelic Athletic Association clubs based in Moycullen, County Galway. The three clubs, Cumann Peile Mhaigh Cuilinn (Moycullen Football Club), Cumann Iománaíocht Maigh Cuilinn (Moycullen Hurling Club) and Cumann Camógaíocht Mhaigh Cuilinn (Moycullen Camogie Club) share playing facilities and cooperate on a number of the local community and sporting issues. The clubs are members of the Galway GAA. There are two other clubs in the parish with indirect GAA affiliations, Moycullen Ladies Football Club and Moycullen Handball Club, who also share the club facilities.

The club facilities are situated in the townland of Baile Dóite and include two full-size pitches, a 25 square metre all-weather pitch, a 20-metre double-sided practice wall, a 200 capacity covered stand, player changing facilities and some small meeting rooms. The site also includes a stand-alone indoor handball complex. There is also considerable capacity for car parking. The history of the GAA in Moycullen goes back to the beginning of the 20th century. It was first organised within the parish by 1912.

Cumann Peile Mhaigh Cuilinn
The football club (Cumann Peile Mhaigh Cuilinn) is in the West Board section of the Galway League and Championships and takes part in all under-age, junior and senior competitions in the county.

Moycullen achieved Senior status in football in 1964 by winning the County Junior Championship and, except for a short stay at Intermediate level in 2008, Moycullen has been senior ever since, having reached 3 County Final. They won their first County Final on their 4th attempt in 2020.

In 2008, the club enjoyed great success at Intermediate level. Having won the County Intermediate title in 2007, Moycullen progressed to the Connacht Intermediate Club Football Championship final, where they defeated Ballintubber of Mayo by 3-11 to 1-08. In the All-Ireland semi-final, they defeated Annascaul after a close encounter, reaching their first ever All-Ireland Intermediate Club Football Championship Final. The final on 18 February at Croke Park was played against Fingal Ravens. A tense game was eventually decided in the last ten minutes, when Conor Bohan struck two goals, ensuring Moycullen were crowned All-Ireland Intermediate Champions, at a score of 2-09 to 1-06. It was the completion of a well-deserved treble.

Over the years, many players have been honoured in all grades by the county. Paul Clancy, an All-Ireland winner in 1998 and 2001, played with the club and worked as a selector with former senior football manager Alan Mulholland. Gareth Bradshaw, Mark Lydon, and David Wynne were recent members of the Galway football panel.

Honours
 Connacht Senior Club Football Championship (1): 2022
 Galway Senior Football Championship (2): 2020, 2022
 All-Ireland Intermediate Club Football Championship (1): 2008
 Connacht Intermediate Club Football Championship (1):2008  Runner-Up 2015
 Galway Intermediate Football Championship (2): 2007, 2015
 Galway Senior B League Champions (1): 2009
 Galway Under-21 West Board Football Championship (1):2005, 2012
 Galway Under-21 West Board Football League (1): 2003
 Galway Minor Football Championship (3): 1966, 2013, 2022
 Galway Minor Football West Board Championship (3): 1966, 2013, 2022
 Galway Minor B Football West Board Championship (2): 1999, 2000

Notable players
 Seán Kelly, appointed Galway senior captain in 2022
 Dessie Conneely
 Peter Cooke
 Paul Clancy
 Paul Kelly
 Owen Gallagher
 David Wynne
 Gareth Bradshaw
 Mark Lydon

References

Gaelic football clubs in County Galway
Gaelic games clubs in County Galway